The women's long jump event at the 1986 European Athletics Championships was held in Stuttgart, then West Germany, at Neckarstadion on 26 and 27 August 1986.

Medalists

Results

Final
27 August

Qualification
26 August

Participation
According to an unofficial count, 18 athletes from 11 countries participated in the event.

 (3)
 (1)
 (1)
 (2)
 (1)
 (2)
 (1)
 (1)
 (3)
 (1)
 (2)

References

Long jump
Long jump at the European Athletics Championships
1986 in women's athletics